Odontomyia ornata,  also called the ornate brigadier, is a European species of soldier fly.

Distribution
Austria, Belgium, Bulgaria, Czech Republic, Denmark, England, France, Germany, Hungary, Israel, Italy, Kazakhstan, Lithuania, Netherlands, Poland, Romania, Russia, Scotland, Slovakia, Spain, Sweden, Switzerland, Syria, Turkey, Yugoslavia.

References

Stratiomyidae
Diptera of Europe
Diptera of Asia
Insects described in 1822
Taxa named by Johann Wilhelm Meigen